Dimitrios Kraniotis (gr. Δημήτριος Κ. Κρανιώτης; born 1950 in Athens, Greece) is a Greek dancer and poet who lives in France.

Biography

Early life
Dimitrios Κ. Kraniotis was born in 1950 in Athens, Greece. He studied philosophy and mathematics in Paris, later also theology and poetry. He lived in the monasteries of Mount Athos.

Career
He started his career as a dancer and choreographic assistant with Jerome Andrews. He was later assistant and dramaturg for Pina Bausch's Wuppertaler Tanztheater. Together with Christine Kono, he has held classes and workshops based on the movement research of Jerome Andrews and classical ballet since 1994.

Bibliography

Poetry
 Eros Etrange Etranger: Desmos/Cahiers grecs, Paris, 1997. Bilingual edition French/Greek, translated by M. Volkovitch. 
 Altier l’Aurige (gr.  O Iníochos Agérochos): Mimnermos, Athens, 1993. Bilingual edition French/Greek, translated by M. Volkovitch.
 Abysmal Spring (gr. Ávyssos Ánoixis): Ikaros, Athens, 1989
 Vagrant Fate (gr. Alítis Moíra): Agra, Athens, 1985.
 Eros Stranger (gr. Ἔρως ἀλλογενής): Athens, 1979

Selected poems
 D'Estoc et d'Intaille - L'epigramme: Les Belles Lettres, Paris, 2003 
 Anthologie de la poésie grecque contemporaine: Gallimard/poésie, Paris, 2000.  
 L'accueil de l'Oblique: Le Nouveau Recueil, N°48, 1998.

References

External links 
 Official Website
 Centre international de poésie Marseille
 Printemps des poètes
 Michel Volkovitch

Living people
1950 births
Writers from Paris
Greek expatriates in France
Greek choreographers
Greek male ballet dancers
Modern Greek poets
20th-century Greek poets
Greek male poets
20th-century French male writers
Musicians from Athens
Musicians from Paris